Rodrigo de Triano (foaled 27 May 1989 – 5 August 2014) was an English Thoroughbred Champion racehorse.

Background
Foaled in Kentucky, and bred and raced by leading British horseman, Robert Sangster, he was out of the mare Hot Princess and sired by  El Gran Senor, a sire of fifty-five stakes race winners. He was trained by Peter Chapple-Hyam at Manton, Wiltshire.

Racing career
Rodrigo de Triano made his debut on 4 July 1991 with a win in the Franklin D. Roosevelt Maiden Stakes at Haydock Park Racecourse. He went on to win his next four starts, capping off his undefeated season with a win in the Group 1 Middle Park Stakes at Newmarket Racecourse on 3 October.

As a three-year-old, Rodrigo de Triano made eight starts. He debuted on 11 April 1992 in the Greenham Stakes at Newbury Racecourse, finishing fourth. He then came back to win two Classics, the 2000 Guineas Stakes at Newmarket and the Irish 2,000 Guineas at the Curragh ridden by Lester Piggott. In The Derby he ran ninth to winner Dr. Devious followed by a fourth-place finish to Brief Truce in the St. James's Palace Stakes at Ascot Racecourse. Given two months off, on 18 August at York Racecourse, Rodrigo de Triano and Piggott returned to top form, defeating Dr. Devious while winning the International Stakes. He next won the Champion Stakes at Newmarket on 17 October defeating Lahib by a neck and then a week later was sold for US$6.2 million to the Japan Racing Association. His new owners sent him to the United States to compete in the US$3 million Breeders' Cup Classic on 31 October, hosted that year by Gulfstream Park in Hallandale Beach, Florida. Racing on dirt for the first time, and starting from post position eleven in a fourteen horse field, Rodrigo de Triano was never in contention and finished last behind winner A.P. Indy in the final race of his career. He was ridden by Walter Swinburn as Lester Piggott had been injured earlier in the afternoon in a fall from Mr Brooks in the Breeders Cup Sprint. For his 1992 performances, Rodrigo de Triano was voted the Cartier Racing Award as the European Champion Three-Year-Old Colt.

Stud record
Rodrigo de Triano was retired to stud duty in Japan beginning in 1993 and was shuttled to New Zealand for a time beginning in 1997. In 2009 he was standing at JBBA Kyushu Stallion Station in Kagoshima. He produced several winners of Conditions races in Japan including Group One winner, Erimo Excel. Rodrigo de Triano died of pneumonia in 2014 at the age of 25.

Pedigree

References

External links
 Career 1-2-3 Colour Chart – Rodrigo de Triano

1989 racehorse births
Racehorses bred in Kentucky
Racehorses trained in the United Kingdom
Irish Classic Race winners
Thoroughbred family 20-a
2014 racehorse deaths
2000 Guineas winners
Deaths from pneumonia